"Voices of Spring" is an orchestral waltz by Johann Strauss II.

Voices of Spring may also refer to:

Voices of Spring (Ashton), a ballet by Frederick Ashton
Voices of Spring (1933 film), directed by Paul Fejos
Voices of Spring (1952 film), directed by Hans Thimig